Civil Bend is an unincorporated community in western Daviess County, in the U.S. state of Missouri.

The community is located on Missouri Route DD just west of I-35. Pattonsburg is approximately four miles to the north-northwest.

History
Civil Bend was platted in 1868, taking its name from a nearby meander of the same name on the Grand River. A post office called Civil Bend was established in 1862, and remained in operation until 1906.

References

Unincorporated communities in Daviess County, Missouri
Unincorporated communities in Missouri